Guy Deutscher may refer to:

 Guy Deutscher (linguist) (born 1969), Israeli linguist
 Guy Deutscher (physicist), Israeli physicist